Axestemys is an extinct genus of softshell turtle that lived from the Late Cretaceous to the Eocene in western North America and Europe.

Axestemys, like its modern relatives, had no scutes on its carapace, which probably had leathery, pliable skin at the sides. Despite living several million years ago, Axestemys would have looked very similar to its modern relatives, with a long neck, a sharp beak, and three toes on each foot. Based on the diet of modern softshell turtles, it was an omnivore, eating water plants, invertebrates, and perhaps small fish.

See also 
 Drazinderetes, another enormous trionychid
 Stupendemys, a giant prehistoric freshwater side-necked turtle
 Archelon, a giant sea turtle of the Cretaceous
 Largest prehistoric animals

References

Further reading 
 
 

Paleocene reptiles of North America
Trionychidae
Paleocene turtles
Prehistoric turtle genera
Hell Creek fauna
Fossil taxa described in 1945
Extinct turtles